Jimmy Yves Newman (August 29, 1927 – June 21, 2014), better known as Jimmy C. Newman (the C stands for Cajun), was an American country music and cajun singer-songwriter and long-time star of the Grand Ole Opry.

Early life
Newman was born near Big Mamou, Louisiana, United States.  As a child, he listened more to Gene Autry than to the Cajun music of the area, but had a number of Cajun songs in his repertoire when, as a teenager, he joined Chuck Guillory's Rhythm Boys.

Early career
He recorded a few unsuccessful sides for J. D. "Jay" Miller's Feature Records in the 1940s, but Miller persuaded Fred Rose in Nashville, Tennessee to give the young singer an opportunity.  In 1953, he was signed to Dot Records and the following year recorded "Cry, Cry, Darling", which reached No. 4 on the country chart.

His recording success led the Louisiana Hayride in Shreveport, Louisiana, to hire him as a regular performer. His next four records all reached Top 10 status, and in 1956 he was invited to become a member of the Grand Ole Opry. That following year he released his biggest hit, "A Fallen Star", which spent two weeks at No. 2 and also entered the top 25 of the Billboard Hot 100 pop chart.

As an established artist, he began to integrate his Cajun influences into his music and recorded "Alligator Man", which was a top 25 record and continued to be his theme song at the Opry. In 1963, he released another top 10 hit, "The D.J. Cried". His final hits came in 1965 and 1966 with "Artificial Rose" and "Back Pocket Money". When his commercial popularity declined he returned to Cajun music, forming his Cajun Country band and taking the high energy fiddle- and accordion-based music of his native Louisiana to fans around the world.  In 1976, his recording of the Cajun French song, "Lâche pas la patate" ("The Potato Song") earned gold record status in Canada. In 1991, Newman and Cajun Country earned a Grammy Award nomination for their album, Alligator Man.

Entertainer Dolly Parton has long credited Newman with enabling her first appearance on the Grand Ole Opry, in 1959, describing how when she appeared at the Opry unannounced at age 13, asking to sing, Newman relinquished one of his two allotted slots to allow Parton to perform.

Later career
In 2000, he was inducted into the North American Country Music Association’s International Hall of Fame and in 2004 was inducted into the Cajun Hall of Fame. He is also honored in the Cajun Music Hall of Fame in Eunice, Louisiana, and in 2009 he was inducted into The Louisiana Music Hall of Fame. He continued to tour and appear regularly at the Grand Ole Opry, making his last appearance on the show on June 6, 2014. In 2006, he joined a select group of entertainers who have marked 50 years of Opry membership.

Personal life
Newman and his wife made their home on their  ranch outside of Nashville near Murfreesboro, Tennessee.

Death
Newman died of cancer, in Nashville, on June 21, 2014.

Discography

Albums

Singles

A"A Fallen Star" peaked at No. 23 on the Billboard Hot 100 and No.7 on the R&B chart.
B"Born to Love You" peaked at No. 35 on the RPM Country Tracks chart in Canada.

References

Bibliography
Seemann, Charlie (1998). "Jimmy C. Newman". In The Encyclopedia of Country Music. Paul Kingsbury, Editor. New York: Oxford University Press. p. 379.

External links
 
 Jimmy C. Newman recordings at the Discography of American Historical Recordings.
 

1927 births
2014 deaths
American country singer-songwriters
American male singer-songwriters
Cajun musicians
Feature Records artists
Charly Records artists
Deaths from cancer in Tennessee
Decca Records artists
Grand Ole Opry members
MGM Records artists
People from Mamou, Louisiana
Singer-songwriters from Louisiana
Country musicians from Louisiana
Country musicians from Tennessee
Singer-songwriters from Tennessee